Battle of River Canard (French Bataille de Rivière aux Canards) was the site of an engagement between British and American forces on July 16, 1812, during the War of 1812. Though it is called the "Battle" of River Canard, it should be thought of as a series of skirmishes. The defined Battle of River Canard is the first skirmish that occurred in a series of small fights, and was the first example of armed conflict in Canada resulting from the War of 1812. An American force of 280 men under Colonels Cass and Miller skirmished with a British force under Lieutenant-Colonel T.B. St. George, consisting of the British 41st Regiment, Indians and Canadian militia, near the bridge. A generalized account of the battle would model after the outcome of the War of 1812, the Battle of Canard technically yielded no winner. American forces drove British soldiers back into a nearby fort, Fort Malden, but the next day Americans abandoned the ground gained.  However, a more specific account suggests American victory. Before the battle, American General William HulI ordered Colonel Cass to scout for British troops. Cass encountered British outposts, and quickly maneuvered to flank the British allied forces consisting of members of the 41st Regiment, under the command of Colonel T.B. St. George. Cass's quick flank proved successful, and forced the British troops to retreat to Fort Malden. Cass's flank also opened a route to British controlled Amherstburg, but aware of the distance between the American main force and the troops that won the battle, General Hull ordered American retreat. During the first skirmish, two British soldiers, James Hancock and John Dean were captured. Hancock would die of his wounds later in the day, becoming the first British casualty of the war. Dean was taken prisoner to Detroit where his left arm was amputated due to wounds.  He would be liberated with the capture of Fort Detroit by the British one month later. Both Hancock and Dean were commended by the presiding administrator, Sir Isaac Brock. By proving a skilled soldier and administrator, Sir Isaac was commonly known as "The Hero of Upper Canada." Sir Isaac died later that year, on October 13, 1812, and is remembered as a war hero.
A second skirmish took place at Turkey Creek in present day LaSalle, where 4 Americans were killed and dismembered by First Nations allied to the British.

See also
List of conflicts in Canada

References

Bibliography

1812 in Lower Canada
River Canard
River Canard
River Canard
July 1812 events
River Canard